Ehrenfried is a male given name (with medieval short forms Immon, Emmo, Ezzo, Immed etc). The name may refer to:

Ehrenfried I (fl. 866–904), count in the Rhineland
Ehrenfrid, son of Ricfrid (10th century), son of a count in the Low Countries
Ehrenfried II (d. c. 970), count in the Rhineland
Ehrenfried or Emmo, Count of Hesbaye (fl. 934-982), count (or counts) in the Low Countries
Ehrenfried (fl. 999), abbot of Gorze Abbey
Ehrenfried or Ezzo, Count Palatine (d. 1034), count in the Rhineland
Emmo of Loon (d. 1078), count in the Low Countries
Carl-Ehrenfried Carlberg (1889–1962), Swedish gymnast who competed in the 1912 Summer Olympics
Christian Ehrenfried Weigel (1748– 1831), German scientist and professor of Chemistry
Ehrenfried Patzel (1914–2004), Ethnic German football player from Czechoslovakia
Ehrenfried Pfeiffer (1899–1961), German scientist
Ehrenfried Günther Freiherr von Hünefeld (1892–1929), German aviation pioneer and initiator of the first transatlantic aeroplane flight from East to West
Ehrenfried Rudolph (born 1935), German cyclist
Ehrenfried Walther von Tschirnhaus (1651–1708), German mathematician, physicist, physician and philosopher
Friedrich Wilhelm Ehrenfried Rost (1768–1835), German theologian, philosopher and classical philologist
Johann Ehrenfried Pohl (1746–1800), German physician and botanist
Johann Karl Ehrenfried Kegel (1784–1863), German agronomist and explorer of the Kamchatka Peninsula
Otto Ehrenfried Ehlers (1855–1895), German traveller

Ehrenfried is a surname. Notable people with the surname include:

Mark Ehrenfried (born 1991), German pianist